On 20 August 1978, a staff bus of El Al airlines in London was attacked by Palestinian Militants. Flight attendant Irit Gidron and one terrorist were killed in the attack, and nine people were wounded.

Attack
At around 13:30, a minibus with staff of El Al airlines was attacked during a stopover at the Europa Hotel in Grosvenor Square, Mayfair, central London, when two or three men opened fire with submachine guns and hand grenades. An El Al flight attendant was killed in the attack, while members of a wedding party were among those wounded by gun shots and a taxi driver was blown from his cab by a grenade. A man presumed to be one of the terrorists was found dead after the attack. A second terrorist was captured by the police, while a possible third escaped.

Aftermath
The Popular Front for the Liberation of Palestine (PFLP) claimed responsibility for the attack. The area of the attack was noted as a hotspot of Arab terrorist activity in the country. The flight attendant killed in the attack, Irit Gidron, 29, was buried in Israel next to the victims of the 1972 Munich Olympics massacre. The terrorist arrested, Fahad Mihyi, was sentenced to life imprisonment for the attack.

In 2000, Yulie Cohen Gerstel, one of the flight attendants injured in the attack, contacted Mihyi who was imprisoned at Dartmoor Prison.  Mihyi was apologetic for his role in the terrorist attack. Gerstel advocated for his parole as shown in the 2002 documentary My Terrorist.

References

Bus attack
1978 mass shootings in Europe
1978 murders in the United Kingdom
1978 bus attack
1970s in the City of Westminster
1970s mass shootings in the United Kingdom
August 1978 crimes
August 1978 events in the United Kingdom
Bus bombings in Europe
El Al accidents and incidents
Israel–State of Palestine relations
Israel–United Kingdom relations
Explosions in 1978
1978 bus attack
Mass shootings in London
1978 bus attack
Palestinian terrorist incidents in Europe
State of Palestine–United Kingdom relations
Popular Front for the Liberation of Palestine attacks
1978 bus attack
Terrorist incidents in the United Kingdom in 1978
Terrorist incidents on buses in Europe